The Chuvanay Range, also known as Chuvan Mountains (Чуванский хребет), is a range of mountains in Chukotka Autonomous Okrug, Russian Far East. Administratively the range is part of Bilibino District. 

The village of Keperveyem is located at the feet of the range in its northwestern end, on the other side of the Maly Anyuy River. Bilibino is located about  further to the north.

Geography
To the east and northeast the mountain range is limited by the course of the Maly Anyuy River, which makes a wide bend, flowing first northwards and then again westwards. To the south the range is bound by the Kulpolney River and to the west by the valley of the Tenvelveyem —left hand tributaries of the Maly Anyuy. A few other tributaries of the Maly Anyuy have their source in the range, flowing between both and joining the left bank of the river. The ghost town of Aliskerovo, beyond which rises the Ilirney Range, lies to the northeast, on the other side of the river, near its confluence with the Egilknyveyem River (Эгилькнывеем). 

To the south and southwest rises the Anyuy Range and to the north the smaller Kyrganay Range. The Chuvanay Range is part of the East Siberian System of mountains and is one of the subranges of the Anadyr Highlands.

The general profile of the mountains is more pointed than the neighboring mountain ranges of Bilibino District, such as the Kyrganay, or the Rauchuan Range further to the north, which are characterized by a smoother relief.

See also
List of inhabited localities in Bilibinsky District
Chuvans

References

External links
Rafting on the Small Anyuy River - Part II
The Chuvanay mountains in the distance (Keperveem, Russia)
ГОРЫ СЕВЕРО-ВОСТОКА РОССИИ
O.Yu.Glushkova, Late Pleistocene Glaciations in North-East Asia

Mountain ranges of Russia
Mountain ranges of Chukotka Autonomous Okrug
Landforms of Siberia